{{Speciesbox
| name = Beaked blind snake
| image = Grypotyphlops acutus 123806704.jpg
| status = LC
| status_system = IUCN3.1
| status_ref = 
| genus = Grypotyphlops
| parent_authority = Peters, 1881
| species = acutus
| authority = (A.M.C. Duméril & Bibron, 1844)
| synonyms = * Onychocephalus acutus A.M.C. Duméril & Bibron, 1884
 Typhlops Russellii Gray, 1845
 Onychocephalus westermanni Lütken, 1862
 Onychocephalus acutus - Günther, 1864
 T[yphlops]. excipiens Jan In Jan & Sordelli, 1865
 Onychocephalus malabaricus Beddome In Günther, 1875
 Gr[ypotyphlops]. acutus - Peters, 1881
 Typhlops acutus - F. Müller, 1885
 Typhlops acutus - Boulenger, 1893
 Gryptotyphlops acutus - Boulenger, 1893
 Typhlops psittacus Werner, 1903
 Typhlops acuta - Constable, 1949
 Typhlops acutus - Rajendran, 1967
 [Typhlina] acutus - Whitaker, 1978
 Typhlops acutus - Murthy, 1983
 Rhinotyphlops acutus - Wallach, 1994
 Letheobia acutus (Duméril & Bibron, 1844)
}}Grypotyphlops acutus, also known as the beaked worm snake, beaked blind snake, or beak-nosed worm snake, is a harmless blind snake species endemic to peninsular India. It is the only species in the genus Grypotyphlops. No subspecies are currently recognized.

 Taxonomy Grypotyphlops is thought to group with the African typhlopids in the genera Afrotyphlops, Letheobia, and Rhinotyphlops, being the sister group to the latter two and having dispersed from Africa to the Indian subcontinent during the Paleogene. This contrasts with the other blind snakes in the Indian subcontinent, which are thought to have either mainland Asian ancestry (Indotyphlops and Argyrophis) or be descended from ancient Gondwanan endemics of Insular India (Gerrhopilus).

Geographic range
This species is found throughout peninsular India south of the Ganges and Rajputana basins. The type locality given is "inconnue" (French for unknown).

References

Further reading

 Boulenger, G.A. 1890. The Fauna of British India, Including Ceylon and Burma. Reptilia and Batrachia. Taylor & Francis, London, xviii, 541 pp.
 Duméril, A.M.C. &  Bibron, G. 1844. Erpetologie Générale ou Histoire Naturelle Complete des Reptiles. Vol.6. Libr. Encyclopédique Roret, Paris.
 Wallach, Van 1994. The status of the Indian endemic Typhlops acutus (Duméril and Bibron) and the identity of Typhlops psittacus'' Werner (Reptilia, Serpentes, Typhlopidae). Bulletin de l'Institut Royal des Sciences Naturelles de Belgique Biologie. Vol. 64, pp. 209–229.

Typhlopidae
Reptiles of India
Endemic fauna of India
Reptiles described in 1844
Taxa named by Gabriel Bibron
Taxa named by André Marie Constant Duméril